Carpoolers is an American television sitcom that aired on ABC from October 2, 2007, to March 4, 2008. The show was created by Bruce McCulloch, who also executive produced alongside Justin Falvey, Darryl Frank, David Miner, Marsh McCall, Joe Russo and Anthony Russo (formerly of Arrested Development). Joe and Anthony Russo also directed the pilot. The series focused on the everyday lives of four male suburbanites with different occupations, who took their private lives and issues along for the ride during their daily commute to and from work.

Produced by DreamWorks Television, ABC Studios, and 3 Arts Entertainment, the series was given a thirteen-episode order on May 11, 2007. and originally aired Tuesdays at 8:30PM Eastern/7:30PM Central following Cavemen. After a brief hiatus, the show returned to ABC's schedule on January 8, 2008 at 9:30PM Eastern/8:30PM Central, following According to Jim.

After the writers strike ended, ABC declined to order any additional episodes of Carpoolers. It has aired in Australia on the Seven Network in the timeslot of 11:30pm Tuesdays, first after Eli Stone, then after Lipstick Jungle.

Creator 
Before the show aired Bruce McCulloch Published a diary breaking down the inspiration for Carpoolers and the process for bring Carpoolers into the world. In the diary, Bruce vents about his frustrations in the industry concerning being constantly hired to produce scripts that would never make it to air. Bruce also talks about the inspiration of Carpoolers and how while driving with his friends made him reflect on why male communion is portrayed on television and how it is cast in a negative light.

Plot
Carpoolers is the story of four very different men. Gracen, the lead character of the show, is an uptight mediator with a wife and son. He and his carpooling companions, Aubrey, a stressed family man, Laird, an egotistical dentist who has lost everything in a divorce and Dougie, a young member of the carpool whose marriage is often mocked by the others, all work at the same building complex. Apart from Gracen and Laird, who are best friends, they usually have no contact outside the carpool. However, in "The Recital", the four realize they are all friends, and become closer. Each episode begins with a cold open of the four carpoolers in a car, usually singing along with a past hit song with the exception of episode 6, in which Aubrey sings along enthusiastically with a commercial for women's pantyliners much to the disgust of everyone else. Following the cold open is a short Carpoolers theme song.

Theme Song 
Carpoolers Theme song: Unlike other shows, Carpoolers theme song didn’t have a “full version”. The song is only 10 second long and most likely written by Bruce McCulloch the show's creator and director. Possible with the help of Gabriel Mann the shows musical composer for 12 episodes of the show.

Pilot 
In the Pilot Episode of Carpoolers “Dougie’s First day or The Toaster” We are introduced to Aubrey (Jerry Minor), Gracen (Fred Goss), Laird (Jerry O’Connell), and Dougie (Tim Peper), who is joining the carpool for the first day, as they commiserate about life and sing old songs on their way to work. Gracen is discouraged to learn that his wife spent $200 on a new toaster when the old one worked fine. This feeling is amplified when Gracen learns that his wife and son both make more money than he does, causing Gracen and his wife to start having some marital issues. This all comes to a climax when the gang break into Gracen's house to steal the new toaster in an effort to save their friend's marriage.

Reocurring jokes and themes

Male Friendship 
Carpoolers episodes usually revolve around the 4 male members of the carpool talking with each other about their lives and families and of course singing. The show creator was open about this show and wanted to show male friendship and relationships in a more positive light.

Marriage and relationships 
Carpoolers explore several different kinds of traditional relationships with each of the main characters having a different kind of relationship in their life.

Dougie is recently married with no kids to the classic Newlyweds couple, Laird is a divorced bachelor who is known for sleeping around, Gracen who is long termed married with one son and Aubrey married with 7 children who are often used as a comedic plot point. These 4 different kinds of relationships are used to contrast and compare each others lives mostly in a comedic way

Other Carpools

The “Cool Carpool” which consists of 4 rich guys 
Multiple appearances in episode 1 and episode 4 most notably for running over Dougie twice in the pilot episode while trying to reserve a parking space.

The “Geyser/old Guy Carpool” which consists of 4 old Men 
Multiple appearances in episode 1 and episode 4 most notably for beating up the gang with a taser and golf clubs for yelling at them in the parking lot.

“Rust bucket Carpool” which consists of 4 men dressed in a “hillbilly” stereotype 
Appearances in episode 4

Possible female Carpool 
Multiple appearances in episode 4, The gang walk past a group of 4 attractive females walking past the gang.

Music

The show was also known for the notable musical choices the show would use for both the intro and outro of the show which the gang would often sing along to. 

 All out of love & More than a feeling  (Episode 1)
 Come on Eileen (Episode 2)
 Thunderstruck & Private Eyes (Episode 4)
 Lady 1973 & Love grows (Episode 5)
 In the Air tonight (Episode 7)
 Little miss can't be wrong (Episode 8)
 Back in Black AC/DC (Episode 10)

Cast and characters

 Fred Goss – Gracen Brooker: A mediator with a wife and son. He and Laird Holcomb are friends as well as neighbors.
 Faith Ford – Leila Brooker: Gracen's sensible wife and successful real estate "flipper".
 Jerry Minor – Aubrey Williber: An accountant who looks after his rambunctious seven kids in addition to working while his lazy wife, who is never seen, but only depicted as a pair of feet, sits in her recliner. His signature catch phrase is "Gentlemen ... let's carpool", usually uttered immediately prior to beginning their journey to work.
 Tim Peper – Dougie: As the new carpooler, he tries to gain acceptance into the group of men while frequently committing major carpooling faux pas. He is a newlywed who likes to tell the others about the joy of marriage and love.
 Allison Munn – Cindy: Dougie's young, dewy wife; they have a saccharine sweet relationship. When she sends Dougie off to work with his lunch she tells him that she "is in every bite".
 T. J. Miller – Marmaduke Brooker: The emotionally stunted, hyper-articulate, hulking adult son of the Brookers who usually spends his entire day at home in his briefs (and towers over his parents by over a foot).
 Jerry O'Connell – Laird Holcomb: A recently divorced dentist whose ex-wife has taken almost everything he owned (except his absercisor and otherwise empty house); he sleeps with as many women as he can.

Episodes

Nielsen Ratings

Weekly ratings

Seasonal ratings 
Seasonal ratings based on average total viewers per episode of Carpoolers on ABC:

+ Information is current as of March 7, 2008.

Public Reception

Carpooler even after it was cancelled had some mixed Online reviews and opinions. 

 IGN

Posted an Advanced Review of the pilot episode calling the a overall disappointing and generic with such quotes as:  
“Overall though, Carpoolers is a comedy that's lacking in many laughs.”

“Watching the show you feel a bit bad for the cast”

 IMBb

With 1723 Reviews has rated the show 7.5/10 with 28.4% of Ratings being 10/10. 

IMDb Reviews also describe the show as “Seinfeld on Wheels” and give it positive review

 Rotten Tomatoes

Rotten Tomatoes rated the show a 23% a low overall rating

 TvGuide

Metascore of 37%

References

External links

2000s American single-camera sitcoms
2007 American television series debuts
2008 American television series endings
American Broadcasting Company original programming
English-language television shows
Television series by 3 Arts Entertainment
Television series by ABC Studios
Television series by DreamWorks Television
Television shows set in Los Angeles